Richo may refer to:

Matthew Richardson (footballer), a former Australian footballer
Alan Richardson, former Australian rules footballer and coach
Daniel Rich, Australian rules footballer
Graham Richardson, an Australian politician turned political commentator
Richo, a television program hosted by Graham 'Richo' Richardson airing on Sky News Australia.
Richo + Jones, a television program hosted by Graham 'Richo' Richardson and Alan Jones airing on Sky News Australia.